Martin Hisao Tanaka (April 22, 1921 – June 30, 1991) was an American professional wrestler better known as Duke Keomuka. He is the father of wrestler Pat Tanaka and referee Jimmy Tanaka.

Biography
Because he was a Japanese American in California during World War II, Tanaka was interned at Manzanar following the signing of Executive Order 9066.

In the 1950s, Keomuka formed a very successful tag team with Hiro Matsuda. Keomuka was also a top wrestler in the 1950s and the 1960s while competing in Texas before settling in Florida.

Keomuka died on June 30, 1991 at the age of 70. His son was scheduled for a match teaming up with Paul Diamond (who at the time worked as Kato of the Orient Express tag team) to take on Haku and The Barbarian but didn't arrive as his father died the day before the match, so his manager Mr. Fuji took his place.

Championships and achievements
50th State Big Time Wrestling
NWA Hawaii Heavyweight Championship (1 time)
Championship Wrestling from Florida
NWA World Tag Team Championship (Florida version) (4 times) - with Hiro Matsuda
Mid-Atlantic Championship Wrestling
NWA Southern Tag Team Championship (Mid-Atlantic version) (2 times) - with Mr. Moto
Midwest Wrestling Association
MWA Ohio Tag Team Championship (1 time) - with Sato Keomuka
Southwest Sports, Inc. / Big Time Wrestling
NWA Brass Knuckles Championship (1 time)
NWA Texas Heavyweight Championship (6 times)
NWA Texas Tag Team Championship (14 times) - with Danny Savich (5), Ivan Kalmikoff (1), Mr. Moto (2), Don Evans (1), Tiny Mills (1), Kinji Shibuya (1), Tony Martin (1), Tokyo Joe (1) and John Tolos (1)
NWA World Tag Team Championship (6 times) - with Taro Miyaki (2), Mr. Moto (1), Tony Martin (1), Antonio Inoki (1) and Fritz Von Erich (1)

References

External links
 

1921 births
1991 deaths
American male professional wrestlers
American sportspeople of Japanese descent
Japanese-American internees
Professional wrestlers from California
Professional wrestling promoters
WCWA Brass Knuckles Champions
20th-century professional wrestlers
NWA World Tag Team Champions (Florida version)